() is a Dutch children's choir maintained by public broadcaster BNNVARA. 

Since 1980 the choir has released one album of new children's songs each year, and is probably the only act from the 1980s with consecutive albums in the  top 40 chart (apart from two releases). The ideas for the songs generally come from children who write in. Well-known Dutch lyricists then turn submitted ideas into finished songs.

The songs on each year's album are presented in a special TV broadcast, staged and recorded in advance (in the group's early years, these shows were broadcast live). Various Dutch celebrities often appear as cast members in these shows. In 2006,  staged its first live pop concert as the basis of its annual broadcast.

 also holds an annual "Song Contest" known as the  that sees the winners of the regional pre-selection rounds (one each province) compete against each other as finalists.

History

Concept

In 1980 program director Flory Anstadt decided to start a children's choir as part of a VARA fund-raising campaign to provide toys to children in developing countries. The choir released an album of songs sung by children ranging in age from 8 to 12 years old. VARA subsequently broadcast performances of the songs on television. The choir was a success and a decision was made to release an album each year from then on. The toy donation campaign ended in 1991. The name of the choir is now the sole reminder of its original function.

Staying true to their main purpose,  is still releasing charity-singles such as:

"  ("Tomorrow is a dream") (2001)
" ("For Asia"), released early 2005 in a re-written version to benefit tsunami victims in Asia.
" ("The beginning of the end"), released in the summer of 2005 to benefit the Dutch development NGO Novib.

The ensemble has been conducted by Babette Labeij since 2005. She succeeded Majel Lustenhouwer, who led the group during its first 25 years. In recognition of 's contribution to Dutch culture under his guidance, Lustenhouwer received a knighthood of the Order of Orange Nassau in 2006.

For the first 21 releases, the first song on each album was always the  anthem. Only albums 5 and 15 were notable exceptions as on those album the anthem was the closing track. Starting with album 22 the custom was changed to make it the closing track instead. The melody has remained the same since 1980, though the lyrics were changed after album 3 to remove a verse about children starving and sleeping in the street. The chorus has stayed the same, while verses have changed over the years to be more celebratory and inclusive, suggesting that children are more open-minded and understanding. Some of the recent albums omit the anthem entirely.

At present
The choir currently consists of around 30 children between 8 and 12 years of age (originally the age limit was 14 instead of 12). Originally the goal was to have participants from throughout the Netherlands. Over time, however, practical considerations intervened and the children recruited as singers are now required to live within close distance of the TV recording studios in Hilversum, southeast of Amsterdam. As a consequence the songs are sung with the characteristic accent of that area, the most noticeable feature of which is the so-called Gooise R: the retroflex pronunciation of the letter R at the end of words and after vowels before consonants in a manner similar to that of American English, although other Rs are realized as trills, either alveolar  or uvular .

The ensemble operates on a yearly production cycle starting with auditions for new members in January. Songs are composed based on ideas from children's letters and go through a judging process, ultimately leaving 12 song choices for the year's CD. The first singing rehearsals begin in March, and dance rehearsals start in September after summer recess. The year's TV program is usually recorded during the autumn school recess. A viewing is held for the children and their families one week before the program is broadcast in November.

A 27-CD box set, released at the end of September 2007, gave the choir their first album top 10 entry in almost a decade.

TV broadcasts

1980–1984
The first broadcast was on 5 December 1980 (St Nicholas Day), hosted by actor Willem Nijholt. The choir-members wore dungarees. Viewers could vote for their favourite song and "" (sung by Annemiek Stuurman) became a top 10 hit early 1981. The album reached number 2 in the charts. In 2001 some of the original choir members reunited for an interview conducted by Reinout Oerlemans for his I Love The 1980s-style series Typisch Tachtig.
The second show too was hosted by Willem Nijholt (sporting a full moustache at the time). The choir was now expanded; among the new faces were Marjon Keller, Mandy Huydts and sisters Laura and Karin Vlasblom, who later went on to form the girl group Frizzle Sizzle. Martijntje van Neerven expressed her concern with the stupidity of fur-hunters in "" ("Second hand coat"). Of the three stand-out songs "" ("On a deserted island") was voted the number 1 favourite and became a top 40-hit. The album peaked at number 3.
The third show hit the screens on 11 November 1982; this time Leonie Jansen, singer/presenter of children's news programme  introduced the songs. "" (about children judged by their dad's profession) opened the show and was that year's single. Other memorable moments include Drummer, "" and "" ("Doctor, I'm tired of stupid"). Martijntje sang the Down's syndrome-themed ballad "" ("My baby brother") and the show ended with "" ("I think I lost it all") before reprising the theme tune. Album 3 became the first one to top the charts.
The fourth album and TV show included show host Willem Ruis (1945–1986). The songs had a more polished sound than previous efforts and made some references to Dutch group Doe Maar who were at the height of their popularity. "" is a request to Doe Maar's keyboard-player to stop singing the atom bomb-themed number one-hit "". In "" ("Unemployed father", Martijntje's last contribution to the choir), the subject matter was angered by hearing the band on record. "" ("Girl group") became a top 20-entry, and "" ("The songs we sing") is a definite reminder that Dutch traditional children's songs are worthless to a generation that prefers to listen to top 40-hits. Like its predecessor, album 4 topped the charts.
16 November 1984 saw the fifth  show; time to look back. Previous members were invited and some of them were interviewed by Willem Ruis. As a bridge to the new songs Frizzle Sizzle (before the name existed) sang a tribute to their days with the choir. Marjon Keller, who left after the fourth album,  was still available for backing vocals. The first of the new songs is "" ("Join the club"), a call for vegetarianism; the idea was actually submitted by a butcher's daughter. Robert Long (1943–2006) wrote "" ("If I Ruled The News") which missed the top 40, unlike "" ("Forever Christmas"). This non-album track was recorded with former BZN-vocalist Annie Schilder and Het Goede Doel. It became the most successful Christmas-hit in Dutch. Album 5 reached second place in the charts.

1985–1989
The show for the sixth album brought a change, as it was the first to be shot on location. The running order of the songs was changed precisely to chronicle the adventures of four siblings, Mark and Sasha, and teenagers Arjen and Krista. The parents were played by Ati Dijckmeester and jazz-musician Edwin Rutten. Album 6 reached number 2 and was notable for the song "" ("Morning Glory"). Two decades later Mark appeared in a To Tell the Truth-style item on Paul de Leeuw's TV-show.
Album 7 aired on 15 November 1986 and was a continuation of its predecessor. "", written by Het Goede Doel frontmen Henk Westbroek & Henk Temming and performed with Edwin Rutten telling he's not Saint Nicholas, became a hit. TV-commercials are parodied in two songs; one of them, ("", which opens the show) namechecked addictive but fictional candy bars and chocolates. Album 7 made the top 5.
Album 8 started off with its fair share of controversy; Freek de Jonge was scheduled to host, but pulled out after it was feared that his contribution would badly affect album sales. He was replaced with actress Simone Kleinsma and show-host Ron Brandsteder. The latter appeared on the extracted single "" as the  father dishing up overexperimental meals in mother's absence. Despite being the first single to miss the top 40 it still became a classic. The TV-show won a Silver Rose at the Montreux Festival and the album hit the number 2 slot.
The ninth show was made with the legendary talk show host Sonja Barend who dressed up as a demented grandmother for one of the songs (""). Highlights include the mixed messages in "" ("Absolutely wrong"), "" ("George and John"), who are assumed to be gay, the anti-kissing song "" ""  being a contemporary Dutch slang for freshman). For the first time omissions had to be made; "" ("Anti-car song") and "" ("It's fun to be a liar") were not performed on the show. Album 9 reached number 5.
From album 10 onwards, the TV-shows were shot on location again. Singer and presenter Hanneke Kappen was this year's guest-celebrity. It was broadcast with English subtitles. The orchestrations, with its jazzy and funky undertones, are reminiscent of the first three albums, but the modern influences are present as well; the hip-hop-flavoured "" ("Fumbling champion") for example, or the Westbroek & Temming-written "" ("French fries, chicken, and apple-sauce"; a popular children's dish). Album 10 fittingly made it to number 10 .

1990–1994
"New decade, new sound" was a general trend in 1990.  was no exception, although the previous two albums had begun the change in direction. Henk Westbroek was now the supervisor and asked new composers to write rock-oriented songs. Tracks such as "" ("All a lot of noise") were previewed in a Derby of the Low Countries contest for schools whose pupils performed their versions of  classics. The show for the 11th album was filmed in Belgium with multi-talented artist and Unicef-ambassador Herman van Veen. The album made it to number 5, 34 places higher than the Best Of that was released at the same time.
The 12th show was made with Youp van 't Hek as the celebrity guest. He played a travelling salesman and sang along on "" ("Everything is for sale"). Ernst Jansz, enduring a break from performing with Doe Maar, usually chronicled an impossible relationship in ""; in this case a schoolgirl-crush on the teacher. Toon Hermans (1917–2000)  made a cameo-appearance in "" ("My father's a clown"). "" ("Waking up with a melody") reached classic-status in years to come. Album 12 reached number 4 in the charts.
The 13th show was made with Sylvia Millecam (1956–2001) as a teacher who dreams of a school trip. Other celebrities involved were Erik van Muiswinkel and Henk Westbroek. "" questions the phrase "maturity". Album 13 made it to number 6, but single "" ("Burning passion") missed the top 40.
In 1993 actor Coen Flink (1932–2000) played a motorbiking grandfather. In a series of prequels he took his so-called granddaughter on a trip down memory lane with former choir members playing adolescent versions of their song-characters. Album 14 reached number 7 in the charts. 
In 1994, album 15 was released; singer-songwriter Frank Boeijen wrote the lead-off single "" ("Grounded"). It reached number 9. A second Best Of was also released with a house-medley of classic tunes. It reached number 22.

1995–1999
With album 16 it was back to basics; singalong songs performed for a live audience which included former choir-members, and (as a first) a live-band. Paul de Leeuw presented and was the celebrity guest-vocalist in 100 Hobby's. Lead-off single was the bluesy "" ("Tomorrow mummy belongs to me"). Album 16 became the choir's first regular release to miss the top 10.
Paul de Leeuw also hosted the 17th show, which was dedicated to the parents of the children who supplied the subject matter. Bennie Jolink from dialect rock-band Normaal wrote "" ("Dirtmouth") which was released as a single with "" ("The Tits Song") on the B-side; the latter was sung by dance-pop artist to be Elize van der Horst to classic-status. Album 17 made it to number 17.
The 18th show was hosted by Menno Bentveld, one of the faces of science program Jules Unlimited. One of the songs featured is "" ("Bullying is not a game") which shared its title with an anti-bullying campaign. Album 18 became a top 10 entry. 
The 19th show took the form of a school drama with actors Marcel Faber and Joep Onderdelinden in the roles of headmaster and janitor. "" ("Dream") was released on single. Album 19 made it to number 13.
Aldith Hunkar,-presenter at the time, hosted this 20th show full of catchy singalongs and razor-sharp messages. Majel Lustenhouwer played an audience member awarded a Most Boring Father before miming the trombone in the song of the same name. Hunkar introduced the finale by expressing her rapping skills. Album 20 reached number 7.

2000–2004
The 21st show was hosted by "monkey-duo" Zap & Surf. Album 21 only reached number 23.
The 22nd show was hosted by Maud Hawinkels who guested on a track about the upcoming replacement of Dutch guilders by Euros.  Other songs are "" ("In love with a horse") and fundraiser "" which opens the album. Album 22 peaked at 16 in the charts.
The 23rd show was made with Klaas van der Eerden who insisted on singing a medley of  classics. By the time he did so everyone already left. Album 23 became the choir's least-selling album ever, missing the charts altogether.
After Willem Nijholt, Willem Ruis, Paul de Leeuw, Klaas van der Eerden became the fourth host to do a second show. Unlike its predecessor, album 24 made it to the charts reaching number 21.
A historic moment; the same celebrity hosting three shows in a row. But this time Klaas van der Eerden was joined by Claudia de Breij. Album 25 reached number 15.

2005–2009
In 2005 Claudia de Breij hosted the show on her own. Album 26 made it to number 14. As the choir was now officially in its 25th year, a new Best Of was released but didn't chart.
Album 27 was the first one with a proper title: ,  named after the track sung by Holly Mae Brood, actress-to-be and daughter of the late rock star/painter Herman Brood.  made it to number 28.
Claudia de Breij and comedian/marathon-runner Dolf Jansen each delivered one song. The pop concert premiered on 26 October 2007 while the TV-special was hosted by actress Isolde Hallensleben.
A new standard was set with the release of the 29th album  (Come Out And Play). It was held in the Amsterdam Arena on 11 October 2008 and was hosted by sports reporter/television host Jack van Gelder and Dutch rapper Ali B.
In 2009, the group released their 30th album,  (Laughter is Healthy) which was accompanied by a lower profile performance for a much smaller audience than previous shows. 2009 was a milestone for the group because it marked their 30th anniversary.

2010–present
 In 2015, album 36  (Weird But True) was released. Among the album's most popular songs was "" ("Why do I have to go?"), written in response to the European migrant crisis. 
 In 2017, album 38 was released;  (Super Scary). The song "" was specifically written to line up with the 2017 ; to fit the royal theme, the music video was filmed in Soestdijk Palace, a former residence of the Dutch royal family.
 2019 marked the release of album 40,  (Travel Along).
 In 2020, album 41 was accompanied by a television-special taped during the COVID-19 pandemic.
 In 2021, album 42,  (Be what you want to be) was released. As part of Dutch TV's 70th anniversary, the choir-members appeared on satire-show ; they sang the theme-tune which opened and closed a classics-medley performed by the original soloists as adults.

Topics addressed in songs
's songs deal with many different subjects. Some frequently recurring themes are:
Advertising ("", "", "")
Animals ("", "", "", "", "" (about vegetarianism), "", "", "", "", "", "", "", "", "", "", "")
Antisocial behaviour ("", "", "")
Being in love ("", "", "", "", "", "", "", "", "", "", "", "", "", "", "", "", "")
Body dysmorphic disorder ("", "")
Boredom ("", "", "", "" (sung by Paul de Leeuw))
Christmas ("", "", "", "", "", "")
Death (of an animal) ("", "")
Death (of a person) ("", "", "", "", "", "", "")
Disability ("", "", "", "", "", "", "", "", "", "", "", "", "", "", "", "")
Discrimination ("", "", "", "")
Divorce ("", "", "", "", "", "")
Eating ("", "", "", "", "", "")
Environmental activism ("", "", "")
Escapism ("", "", "", "", "", "", "", "", "", "", "", "", "", "", "", "", "")
Forgetfulness ("", "", "")
Friendship ("", "" (George and John), "", "", "")
Generational conflict ("", "", "", "", "", "", "", "", "", "", "", "", "", "")
Growing up ("", "", "", "", "", "", "", "", "", "", "", "", "", "", "")
Holidays: ("", "", "", "" (Italy), "", "" (Ireland), "", "", "")
Home ("", "", "", "", "")
Homosexuality / LGBT adoption ("")
Injustice ("", "")
International Adoption ("")
Loneliness ("", "", "", "", "", "", "", "")
Money ("", "", "", "" (KvK 11), "", "", "", "" (KvK 18), "")
Moods ("", "", "", "")
Music ("", "", "", "", "", "", "", "", "")
Nostalgia ("", "", "")
Phobias ("", "", "", "", "")
Shyness ("", "")
Superstition ("", "")
Taunting and mobbing ("", "", "", "", "", "", "", "", "", "", "")
Tobacco smoking ("", "", "")
War ("", "", "")

Former members with notable solo careers

Discography

Albums

Singles

References

External links

 official website 
Biography and chronology at the Netherlands' National Pop Institute 
Expert says KvK sing-along CDs may be behind spread of Gooise r   – article in NRC Handelsblad, July 15, 2000 citing Prof. Hans Van de Velde of the Université Libre de Bruxelles

1980 Dutch television series debuts
Children's charities based in the Netherlands
Children's musical groups
Choirs of children
Dutch-language songs
Dutch pop songs
Dutch children's songs
Dutch children's television series
Musical groups from North Holland
Musical groups established in 1980
Dutch-language television shows
1980s Dutch television series